Avcılar Merkez Üniversite Kampüsü, or just Avcılar is a station on the Istanbul Metrobus Bus rapid transit line. It is located between the D.100 state highway in Avcılar, Istanbul. The station is the terminus for two of the seven metrobus routes; 34 and 34AS.

Avcılar station was opened on 17 September 2007, as part of the original 16 stations of the Istanbul Metrobus system.

References

External links
Avcılar Merkez Üniversite Kampüsü station
Avcılar Merkez Üniversite Kampüsü in Google Street View

Istanbul Metrobus stations
2007 establishments in Turkey
Avcılar, Istanbul